In mathematics, the cone of curves (sometimes the Kleiman-Mori cone) of an algebraic variety  is a combinatorial invariant of importance to the birational geometry of .

Definition
Let  be a proper variety.

 

It is not difficult to see that  is indeed a convex cone in the sense of convex geometry.

Applications
(In general,  need not be closed, so taking the closure here is important.)

A more involved example is the role played by the cone of curves in the theory of minimal models of algebraic varieties. This process encounters difficulties, however, whose resolution necessitates the introduction of the flip.

A structure theorem
The above process of contractions could not proceed without the fundamental result on the structure of the cone of curves known as the Cone Theorem. The first version of this theorem, for smooth varieties, is due to Mori; it was later generalised to a larger class of varieties by Kawamata, Kollár, Reid, Shokurov, and others. Mori's version of the theorem is as follows:

Cone Theorem. Let  be a smooth projective variety. Then

1.

 

2. For any positive real number  and any ample divisor ,

 

where the sum in the last term is finite.

The second assertion then tells us more: it says that, away from the hyperplane , extremal rays of the cone cannot accumulate. When  is a Fano variety,   because  is ample. So the cone theorem shows that the cone of curves of a Fano variety is generated by rational curves.  

If in addition the variety  is defined over a field of characteristic 0, we have the following assertion, sometimes referred to as the Contraction Theorem:

3.
(See also: contraction morphism).

References

 Lazarsfeld, R., Positivity in Algebraic Geometry I, Springer-Verlag, 2004. 
 Kollár, J. and Mori, S., Birational Geometry of Algebraic Varieties, Cambridge University Press, 1998. 

Algebraic geometry
Birational geometry